Jack Hildyard, B.S.C. (17 March 1908, London – 5 September 1990, London) was a British cinematographer who worked on more than 80 films during his career.

Career
He made several films with David Lean including The Sound Barrier (1952) and Hobson's Choice (1954), as well as The Bridge on the River Kwai (1957), for which he won an Academy Award for Best Cinematography and the British Society of Cinematographers Award.

His first film was Freedom of the Seas in 1934, as a focus puller, before working as camera operator on films for Leslie Howard and others, including Pygmalion, The Divorce of Lady X and Pimpernel Smith. His first film as cinematographer was Laurence Olivier's 1944 film Henry V, which gave him invaluable experience of colour cinematography and his subsequent films made him one of the most sought after cameramen in England.

His other films included Caesar and Cleopatra (1945), Anastasia (1956), The Sundowners (1960), 55 Days at Peking (1963), Battle of the Bulge (1965), Casino Royale (1967), The Beast Must Die (1974), Emily (1976), and The Wild Geese (1978). He photographed both of producer-director Moustapha Akkad's films on Islamic history, The Message (1976) and Lion of the Desert (1981) and in 1983, director Mohamed Shukri Jameel's film, produced by Saddam Hussein, Al-Mas' Ala Al-Kubra, which was nominated for the Golden Prize at the 1983 Moscow International Film Festival.

Awards
He was also nominated for BAFTA Awards for his work on The V.I.P.s (1963), The Yellow Rolls-Royce (1964) and Modesty Blaise (1966).

He was awarded the British Society of Cinematographers Lifetime Achievement Award in 1990.

Personal life
Jack Hildyard was the brother of sound engineer and two times Oscar winner David Hildyard.

References

External links
 
 

1908 births
1990 deaths
British cinematographers
Best Cinematographer Academy Award winners